Dinamo-Auto Stadium is a football stadium in Moldova built in 2011. It is based in village Tîrnauca, near Tiraspol.

References

External links
Official site 

Football venues in Moldova
Football venues in Transnistria
Buildings and structures in Tiraspol
Multi-purpose stadiums
FC Dinamo-Auto Tiraspol